Prionoceras is an extinct genus of ammonites. It lived during the Devonian period. Prionoceras divisum is the type specimen from the Fichtel Mountains.  Specimens have been found in Algeria, China, Germany, Kazakhstan, Morocco, and Poland.

References

External links
 

Prionoceratidae
Goniatitida genera